Hospita is former Ancient city and Roman bishopric, in present Algeria, now a Latin Catholic titular see.

History 
Hospita was one of many cities in the Roman province of Numidia, important enough to become a suffragan bishopric, but like most faded completely.

Its only recorded bishops were :
 Bennatus, participating in the conference of Carthage of 411, confronting Catholic and Donatist (heretical) bishops in Roman North Africa, 
 joined by his Donatist counterpart as anti-bishop of Hospita, Lucullus.
 Gedalius partook in the synod called in Carthage in 484 by the Vandal king Huneric, again with Donatists, after which he was exiled with his Catholic peers.

Titular see 
The diocese was nominally restored in 1933: Established as Latin Titular bishopric of Hospita (Latin) / Ospita (Curiate Italian) / Hospiten(sis) (Latin adjective).

It has had the following incumbents, so far of the fitting Episcopal (lowest) rank :
 José Melhado Campos (1965.02.22 – 1973.01.08) as Coadjutor Bishop of Sorocaba (Brazil) (1965.02.22 – 1973.01.08), next succeeding as Bishop of Sorocaba (1973.01.08 – retired 1981.03.20); previously Bishop of Lorena (Brazil) (1960.05.29 – 1965.02.22); died 1996
 Tadeusz Józef Zawistowski (1973.05.12 – death 2015.06.01) as Auxiliary Bishop of Roman Catholic Diocese of Łomża (Poland) (1973.05.12 – retired 2006.02.11) and on emeritate
 Cristián Carlo Roncagliolo Pacheco (2017.03.23 – ...), Bishop-elect, Auxiliary Bishop of Archdiocese of Santiago (de Chile  (2017.03.23 – ...), no previously prelature.

Other uses 
 pen name of novelist Charles Lamb
 Latin (fem. of hospes 'host'; adopted in various languages) for a landlady.

See also 
 List of Catholic dioceses in Algeria

Sources and external links 
 GCatholic - data for all sections
 Bibliography
 Pius Bonifacius Gams, Series episcoporum Ecclesiae Catholicae, Leipzig, 1931, p. 466
 Stefano Antonio Morcelli, Africa christiana, Volume I, Brescia, 1816, pp. 187–188

Catholic titular sees in Africa